Abisara kausambi, the straight plum Judy, is a small but striking butterfly found in the Indomalayan realm that belongs to the Punches and Judies, that is, the family Riodinidae.
A. k. kausambi Manipur to Burma, Malaya, Borneo, Sumatra Peninsular Malaya
A. k. tina   Fruhstorfer, 1904   Java
A. k. sabina   Stichel, 1924  Sulawesi
A. k. aja   Fruhstorfer, 1904  Palawan
A. k. asoka   Bennett, 1950    Borneo
A. k. daphne   Bennett, 1950    Nias
A. k. disparilis   Riley, 1945    Mentawai
A. k. sala   Fruhstorfer, 1914   Borneo
A. k. stasinus   Fruhstorfer, 1912    Bangka, Belitung

Biology
The larva feeds on Embelia

See also
Riodinidae
List of butterflies of India
List of butterflies of India (Riodinidae)

References
 

Abisara
Fauna of Pakistan
Butterflies of Asia
Butterflies of Singapore
Butterflies described in 1843